Robert Lee Williams (December 20, 1868 – April 10, 1948) was an American lawyer, judge, and the third governor of Oklahoma. Williams played a role in the drafting of the Oklahoma Constitution and served as the first Oklahoma Supreme Court chief justice. He also served as a United States circuit judge of the United States Court of Appeals for the Tenth Circuit and as a United States district judge of the United States District Court for the Eastern District of Oklahoma. As Governor, Williams oversaw the state's response to the United States Supreme Court's ruling against Jim Crow laws and its involvement in World War I. He instituted the Oklahoma State Board of Affairs, which provided central purchasing services to state agencies. Due to his direct administrative role and concentration of power, Williams counteracted the loss of executive power under Governor Lee Cruce.

Early life and education

Williams was born on December 20, 1868, near Brundidge, Alabama. Williams earned a Bachelor of Arts degree in 1892 and a Master of Arts degree in 1894, both from the old Southern University in Greensboro, Alabama. One degree included a study of Methodist doctrines, entitling him to become a certified minister. He read law and passed the Alabama bar exam in 1891 at the age of 23 and began his practice in Troy, Alabama. At the age of 25, Williams, in 1893, moved to the Cherokee Outlet in the Indian Territory following its opening where he briefly practiced law in Orlando. After briefly moving back to Alabama, Williams returned to the Indian Territory in 1897 and settled in Durant. He became increasingly involved in local politics and a driving force behind the Democratic Party in modern-day eastern Oklahoma in his role as the national committeeman from the Indian Territory.

Statehood convention delegate

Selected to represent Durant and the surrounding area at the Oklahoma Constitutional Convention, Williams traveled to Guthrie where he would meet two men that would have profound effects on both his and Oklahoma's future: Charles N. Haskell and William H. Murray. Through their labors, Oklahoma's Constitution was established and Oklahoma became a state on November 16, 1907. On that same day, Haskell was inaugurated as the first Governor of Oklahoma.

Oklahoma Supreme Court Chief Justice

Through his friendship with Haskell and his own skill as an attorney, Williams was appointed by Haskell to the Oklahoma Supreme Court. Once on the Court, Williams was selected to serve as the Court's first chief justice. He was reappointed that post again in 1908 and would serve in that office until 1914, the only position he would hold on Oklahoma's highest court.

In 1914, before the end of Oklahoma's second governor's term, Governor Lee Cruce, Williams resigned from his position as chief justice in order to place his name in the Democratic primaries for Governor of Oklahoma. His fame as Chief Justice easily won him the Democratic nomination. Williams was fiercely conservative, possessed an assertive personality, and held a high sense of duty. Williams' Republican opponent was John Fields, the editor of a farm-related newspaper based in Oklahoma City. Williams faced a difficult fight for the governorship with Fields' paper granting him the majority of the farm-related voters' vote. Despite this Williams' popularity won him the victory by a narrow margin. He was inaugurated as the third Governor of Oklahoma on January 11, 1915.

Governor of Oklahoma

On January 1, 1917, Williams officially moved into the Oklahoma State Capitol before it was completed. On July 1 of that year the state officially took control of the building. The next year on March 18, 1918, the Oklahoma Legislature would hold its first meeting in its new permanent home. Despite the state's adoption of the building, it was not completed until 1919. Even upon its completion, it lacked a dome. In 2000, Governor Frank Keating proposed that a dome be added. The building was finally "completed" with the erection of the dome on November 16, 2002.

When Williams took office, Oklahoma was suffering terrible economic troubles. Hoping to save the state, he implemented policies that he believed would solve the problems and bring improvement. First, Williams proposed legislation levying new taxes while appropriations for state institutions were decreased in order to reduce the state's deficit in the budget.

One of William's greatest advances in the state's economy came when he instituted the Oklahoma State Board of Affairs, which provided central purchasing services to state agencies. The board's existence allowed for the consolidation of numerous state boards, agencies, and institutions. Williams influenced Oklahoma's budget by making appointments and setting salaries. Due to his direct administrative role and concentration of power, Williams would regain a measure of the executive power that Cruce's administration had lost.

William's main mindset throughout his administration was reform. Through legislative action and program policy changes, Oklahoma instituted a highway construction bill, a state insurance bond, the office of pardon and parole, and a State fiscal agency. Williams and state legislators amended the laws regarding the impeachment of state officials, provided for the aid of agriculture, created oil and gas divisions within the Oklahoma Corporation Commission, and changed the composition of the Oklahoma Supreme Court from six to nine justices.

The Williams administration was marked by two events. The first was the landmark Supreme Court of the United States case Guinn v. United States in 1915. When state officials enforced Oklahoma's Jim Crow laws, an appeal was made to the United States Supreme Court. When the court ruled that laws that "serve no rational purpose other than to disadvantage the right of African-American citizens to vote violated the Fifteenth Amendment," many state officials were indicted and sentenced for violation of federal election laws. This prompted Williams to call the state legislature into special session in 1916 to determine constitutional methods of black suffrage. They enacted a constitutional amendment that asked voters to approve a literary test in Oklahoma as a voting requirement. The proposal, however, was rejected by voters, enabling many African-Americans the right to vote for the first time.

The second major event in his gubernatorial term was when the United States was forced to deal with World War I in 1916. The Great War would cast its shadow over the remainder of the governor's term. Numerous domestic priorities were dropped in favor of the state's mobilization in preparation for war. The Oklahoma military was swelled through local draft boards, the maximum food production was encouraged to feed United States allies, the promotion of fuel and food conservation was enacted, and Williams acted as a moderator between the pro-war and anti-war factions of the state.

By the time January 13, 1919 rolled around, Williams was uninterested in running again. Oklahoma had elected to replace him with James B. A. Robertson, whom Williams had defeated in the 1914 Democratic primaries for governor.

Federal judicial service

Williams was nominated by President Woodrow Wilson on December 3, 1918, to a seat on the United States District Court for the Eastern District of Oklahoma vacated by Judge Ralph E. Campbell. He was confirmed by the United States Senate on January 7, 1919, and received his commission the same day. His service terminated on April 21, 1937, due to his elevation to the Tenth Circuit.

Williams was nominated by President Franklin D. Roosevelt on March 25, 1937, to a seat  on the United States Court of Appeals for the Tenth Circuit vacated by Judge George Thomas McDermott. He was confirmed by the Senate on April 20, 1937, and received his commission on April 21, 1937. He assumed senior status on March 31, 1939. His service terminated on April 10, 1948, due to his death.

Death

Williams died at his home in Durant, Oklahoma, on April 10, 1948, after a stay in Wilson N. Jones Hospital in Sherman, Texas. He is buried in City Cemetery in Durant.

State of the State Speeches
First State of State speech
Second State of the State speech
Third State of the State speech

Note

References

1868 births
1948 deaths
Alabama lawyers
People from Brundidge, Alabama
Democratic Party governors of Oklahoma
Chief Justices of the Oklahoma Supreme Court
Judges of the United States District Court for the Eastern District of Oklahoma
United States district court judges appointed by Woodrow Wilson
Judges of the United States Court of Appeals for the Tenth Circuit
United States court of appeals judges appointed by Franklin D. Roosevelt
20th-century American judges
Methodists from Oklahoma
Oklahoma lawyers
People from Durant, Oklahoma
United States federal judges admitted to the practice of law by reading law
Birmingham–Southern College alumni